Pagurapseudidae is a family of crustaceans in the order Tanaidacea. Like hermit crabs, they inhabit empty gastropod shells, but can be told apart from hermit crabs by the lack of a carapace, revealing the segmentation of the thorax, and by the greater number of legs: hermit crabs have five pairs of legs, of which the first has large claws, and the last is highly reduced, while in Pagurapseudidae, there is one pair of claws, plus six further walking legs.

The family Pagurapseudidae contains the following subfamilies and genera:
Hodometricinae Gutu, 1981
Hodometrica Miller, 1940
Indoapseudes Bacescu, 1976
Parapagurapseudopsis Brum, 1973
Similipedia Gutu, 1989
Pagurapseudinae Lang, 1970
Macrolabrum Bacescu, 1976
Pagurapseudes Whitelegge, 1901
Pagurotanais Bouvier, 1918

References

Tanaidacea
Crustacean families